The  2018 European Artistic Roller Skating Championships were held in Lagoa, Portugal from August 31 to September 4, 2018. Organized by European Confederation of Roller Skating and Federação Portuguesa de Patinagem, the event took place at the Escola Secundária da Lagoa pavilhão with 960-seats capacity.

Participating nations
13 nations entered the competition.

Medallists

Medal table

References

External links 
 
 Confédération Européenne de Roller Skating

European 2018
2018 in roller sports
2018 in Portuguese sport